Dianna Elise Agron (born April 30, 1986) is an American actress and singer. After primarily dancing and starring in small musical theater productions in her youth, Agron made her screen debut in 2006, and in 2007, she played recurring character Debbie Marshall on Heroes and had her first leading role. In 2009, she took the notable role of the antagonistic but sympathetic head cheerleader Quinn Fabray on the Fox musical comedy-drama series Glee. For her role in the series, she won a SAG Award and, as part of the cast, was nominated for the Brit Award for Best International Breakthrough Act, among other accolades.

After Glee proved to be a breakthrough success, Agron began working more in film, first starring in the popular young adult adaptation I Am Number Four (2011) as Sarah Hart before taking on films aimed at more diverse audiences, including the 2013 mob-comedy The Family and 2015's Bare. She has also directed several short films and music videos and, in 2017, began performing as a singer at the Café Carlyle in New York City, while continuing to star in films including Novitiate and Hollow in the Land in 2017, Shiva Baby in 2020, and As They Made Us in 2022. She directed part of the 2019 anthology feature film Berlin, I Love You, as well as acting in it. As a singer, Agron is noted for her husky lyric contralto voice.

Agron is Jewish and has spoken of how her religion relates to her career. She has also been involved with significant charity work, particularly in support of LGBT rights and human rights.

Early life
Dianna Elise Agron was born on April 30, 1986, in Savannah, Georgia, to Mary (née Barnes), a seamstress, and Ronald S. "Ron" Agron, a former general manager of Hyatt hotels. Her father was born to a Jewish family, while her mother converted to Judaism before they married. Agron has a younger brother, Jason Agron, a photographer. She is Ashkenazi Jewish, of Russian Jewish descent; her father's family were Jewish immigrants from Novgorod-Seversky in Eastern Europe, and the family's original surname was Agronsky. She is distantly related to Gershon Agron and Martin Agronsky. Agron grew up in San Antonio, Texas and Burlingame, California; her family lived in various hotels due to her father's career, but her mother made sure that Agron and her brother knew this was not the norm. Agron has said that there was always music from the 1960s and 1970s playing at their home, and that her mother sheltered her (though not her brother) from watching contemporary films and television even as a teenager, opting to let her watch mostly classic musicals because she felt they had "a certain amount of loveliness to [them]". Being exposed to the "fairytale" and "fantastical" image of Hollywood from these films influenced Agron's decision to pursue acting, while her interest in storytelling comes from seeing different lives unfold around her growing up in the "fishbowl environment" of hotels.

Agron lived in Texas from the age of two until she was nine, and took up dancing at the age of three, studying jazz and ballet, and later hip-hop dancing. She often performed in local and school musical theater productions, including as Dorothy Gale in The Wizard of Oz when she was eight. She attended Hebrew school growing up, as well as being educated at a Jewish day school through third grade. She was bullied harshly for her Jewish faith while living in Texas and noted that she assumed having police guarding their Temple was normal until the family moved to California, adding that being Jewish was a large part of her identity as a child because of how it ostracized her. When the family moved to California, Agron attended Lincoln Elementary School, Burlingame Intermediate School, and Burlingame High School in the Bay Area; she attended religious school and had her bat mitzvah at the Reform Judaism-practicing Peninsula Temple Sholom. She said that she found it much easier to make friends there than she had in Texas, though described her middle school experience as sometimes unpleasant, giving the example of a boy following her around and calling her a man when, aged thirteen, her voice dropped significantly. This gave her a complex about how her voice sounded and she avoided speaking and singing in her natural register for a long time, though she overcame this and credits it with giving her a thick skin.

In high school, Agron was on the homecoming court in both her junior and senior years, tying for homecoming queen with a friend; she has said she was not "popular" in a stereotypical sense in high school, but had many friends in different groups. She was involved in school theater, performing in Vanities and Grease as a senior, and helping with set design, costumes, and painting. Agron has broken her nose twice. The first break occurred when she was fourteen, but she did not have it repaired until it was damaged again on a day off during the Glee tour. She was also injured in a traffic collision and underwent physical therapy in high school. As a teenager, Agron was a dance teacher and worked at a local boutique, Morning Glory, where she "became enthralled with fashion". Though her mother dressed her in doll-style dresses, she began experimenting with fashion in high school. She took piano lessons and said that she came to love photography in high school, as well, where she learnt on film. When she was a teenager, her father became ill with what the family would determine was multiple sclerosis after tests proved indefinitive; Agron was not made aware of his illness until she was fifteen, when he had a stroke and began losing his cognitive and physical abilities. She spoke to Cosmopolitan about the impact of this on her family, which caused her parents' marriage to fall apart, saying the separation was devastating for her and her brother. She added that she "had to play therapist to [her] family[,] be the glue". She later said that, when her father became ill, he "lost his faith for some time" and the family stopped attending Temple.

Career

2006–2008: Early career and Heroes
Agron moved to Los Angeles in 2005, attending an audition for a dance agency on the same day. She had wanted to go to New York, but instead chose Los Angeles as it was closer to her family in case she needed to support them. She was signed by the agency and told them that she wanted to be in musicals; they sent her out for music video auditions. Agron was hesitant to be in music videos, worrying that she could not be considered both a dancer and an actress, though she agreed to be in the video for Robin Thicke's "Wanna Love You Girl"; she was cut when Pharrell Williams became involved and the concept was changed. Her dance agency helped her find an acting agent and she again requested to be considered for musicals, which she was told were too outdated. When she moved to Los Angeles she also began to watch movies other than old musicals; after watching 2001 and A Clockwork Orange back-to-back she was pleasantly surprised at how much more scope there was available as an actor.

From 2006 to 2008 she appeared on television series including Shark, Close to Home, Drake & Josh, CSI: NY and Numbers. Her first film role was an uncredited appearance as a cheerleader in the 2006 remake film When a Stranger Calls. Agron told Rolling Stone that during her early career most of the film roles she was offered were horror films or nudity, and that she turned down all of these. She instead appeared in comedy films like Skid Marks and Rushers, which won the short film audience award at the 2007 Method Fest, and the action-thriller film T.K.O.. She had a recurring role in the third season of Veronica Mars as Jenny Budosh, a student in Veronica's criminology class at college who is also involved with a fraud cover-up. During her early years in Los Angeles, Agron lived in the same building as Christina McDowell and Emma Stone, which was once raided by a SWAT team, and spent time with them and other "young artists and starlets" in the neighborhood, including Lindsay Lohan and Amanda Bynes.

In 2007 she played the main role of Harper in the Milo Ventimiglia-directed MTV series It's a Mall World, alongside Sam Huntington, for its single season. She then appeared in a recurring role for the second season of Heroes as Debbie Marshall, the mean captain of the cheerleading squad at the new school Claire Bennet attends. Initially, she read for the nice cheerleader role, as she had previously been typecast as the "nice girl", but a producer thought it would be more interesting to see her play a mean character. She said that when she was cast in the role it "helped open a lot of people's eyes to [her], as an actor", because it is different to who she is as a person. During the 2007–2008 writers' strike, when auditions stopped, Agron wrote a feature screenplay about a 28-year-old man and his relationships with different women in his life as he learns how to say "I love you", which was optioned in 2008; Agron had wanted to direct the film.

2009–2011: Glee, I Am Number Four and early film roles

Agron landed her breakthrough role in 2009 as Quinn Fabray on the Fox musical comedy-drama series Glee. Media journalist Jon Caramanica described the character in April 2010 as a "conniving though angelic-seeming cheerleader". Agron was the last principal actor to be cast, having won the role only days before the pilot began filming; struggling to cast Quinn, the producers were going to remove the character, but Fox wanted to keep her in the pilot and casting director Robert J. Ulrich convinced them to let him see more auditions. The producers had felt the character would be unnecessary if she could not be given more depth, though they did not initially reveal this to Agron; Ulrich told Variety that when they saw her audition, the show finally "came together". Shortly before Glee, Agron had over thirty unsuccessful auditions for a small role in a musical, and so auditioned with no expectations. In her audition she sang Frank Sinatra's "Fly Me to the Moon". Before offering her the part, the production worried she would appear too innocent and asked her to come back looking sexier; she later said that this request "was like hearing nails on a chalkboard." Of Agron's casting, showrunner Ryan Murphy said: "she ruined the part for me... she humanized it. She can cry at the drop of a hat. So now her character has a conscience, a soul and great vulnerability." Agron's portrayal of Quinn was praised, and she made her musical debut at the end of the second episode, "Showmance", performing Dionne Warwick's "I Say a Little Prayer". In 2009, members of the Glee cast, including Agron, performed the national anthem before Game 3 of the World Series.

During the hiatus away from filming Glee in the summer of 2009, Agron wrote, starred in, directed, and executive-produced an unreleased short comedy film called A Fuchsia Elephant. The plot revolves around Agron's character, Charlotte Hill, who recreates her eighth birthday party with her friend Michael, played by Dave Franco, also a producer, on the day before she turns eighteen. She directed the 2010 music video for "Body" by Thao & The Get Down Stay Down, and took on more film roles in 2010 and 2011 with various supporting parts, including Natalie in Burlesque and the cheerleader Samantha in Bold Native, an animal liberation terror film. Agron had played multiple "mean cheerleader" roles, and when she began to be offered more during Glee first season she asked her team to start turning them away. Agron was positioned as a top choice for the role of Gwen Stacy in the reboot of the Spider-Man films when The Amazing Spider-Man began casting in 2010, but lost out to Emma Stone. Deadline reported there were concerns about the availability of Agron, who tested for the role just as Glee second season began, due to having a large role on a major network show. In 2011 she tested for the part of Lois Lane in the DC Extended Universe film Man of Steel, though there were concerns that she was too young for the role; it went to Amy Adams.

During Glee second season, Emily St. James for The A.V. Club wrote that Agron was "one of the show's best actors" but often sidelined. In the episode "Born This Way" she performed a duet with Lea Michele (as Rachel Berry) of "I Feel Pretty" from West Side Story and TLC's "Unpretty". The Observer named this the best Glee cover, praising Agron's "soft and comforting vocals" and saying that as "a cult favorite of Glee fans in 2020, this one deserves all the hype even outside the show's kitschy walls." The song has been highly praised and was voted the best Glee number in a 2011 TVLine fan vote elimination bracket. Murphy has also said it was his favorite cover from the show. As a costume and extreme makeup lover, Agron has highlighted parts of this season as her favorite moments of the show, naming "The Rocky Horror Glee Show", particularly "Time Warp", and the performance of "Thriller", though she was the cause for a brief delay in filming of the latter number when she became ill in December 2010. On Glee, Quinn often sang as a soprano, which Agron said "was on the highest part of [her] vocal register that [she] can access ... but it's not where [she feels] the most confident and comfortable". Agron rarely sang in her chest voice in the first season, and in 2011 HuffPost described Quinn's singing register as falsetto. Agron suggested that Quinn having a high voice may have been her fault, as she had auditioned using a higher speaking voice to reflect her character's young age and personality, saying: "[Quinn] sees herself as having to be elite and perfect, so I didn't see her with this [Agron's] raspy voice." She struggled to maintain the affected voice in Glee second season, and changed it for the third. In 2011, Agron wrote the Time 100 entry for her Glee co-star Chris Colfer.

Her breakthrough movie role came in the 2011 YA adaptation I Am Number Four as co-lead Sarah Hart, whom Agron described as an "artsy kid that is a little misunderstood". Agron took on the role because it was different to her Quinn character, and said that while she wanted to work during the Glee hiatus, she would not take just any project that fit in her schedule because "it's so hard as an actor to really engage with a character and a script if you don't love it". Her filming restrictions for Glee meant she almost did not get the role. The shoot got moved to the summer, when Agron was available, and she learned she got the role a few weeks before filming. Photography began in Pittsburgh in the summer of 2010, the day after the first Glee tour finished. Reviews for the film were mixed. Agron's I Am Number Four co-lead was Alex Pettyfer; after Pettyfer dropped out of playing Tom in Seventh Son in May 2011, Agron tested for the role of Alice Deane.

In the third season of Glee, Agron sang her first solo number since the first season, "Never Can Say Goodbye" by the Jackson 5. The song, which had been leaked before the episode, received positive reviews. The character's stories in this season were less well-received, with reviews employing humor to say that the writing did not provide Agron with strong material. In one story, her character was paralyzed in a car accident, but only for four episodes before she was performing again; Agron had previously said that the story, which she discussed with Murphy, would be "slow and gradual" as Quinn struggles through accepting a more challenging situation. In 2019, The Guardian termed the brief paralysis, and the related "cringe-inducing" performance of "I'm Still Standing", as the show's "defining shark-jumping moment", though critics praised Agron's acting. Speaking to MTV following the car accident episode, Agron said that she had "fun challenges" playing Quinn who "always was changing". After the third season aired, Agron appeared as a guest mentor on The Glee Project second season episode "Actability".

Several songs performed by Agron as Quinn have been released as singles, made available for digital download, and featured on the show's soundtrack albums. Many songs performed on Glee were pop music, including several by Agron, though she was also noted as the show's easy listening vocalist, performing some Motown. "I Say a Little Prayer" charted in the UK Singles Chart at 125, and her cover of the Supremes' "You Keep Me Hangin' On" reached 166 on the UK Singles. These songs were released on Glee: The Music, Volume 1 (the former as an iTunes bonus track), which was nominated for a Grammy Award for Best Compilation Soundtrack for Visual Media. Caramanica criticized the fact that Agron's cover of "Papa Don't Preach" was omitted from the soundtracks, writing that it was "one of the most grounded and moving covers the show has yet done". "Papa Don't Preach" was later released as a single, charting at 81 on the UK Singles, as was "It's a Man's Man's Man's World", which charted in the Canadian Hot 100 at 73, UK Singles Chart at 94 and on the Billboard Hot 100 at 95. Her cover of "Never Can Say Goodbye" reached 107 on the Billboard charts. As a featured singer in the cast of Glee, Agron and her castmates hold numerous accolades: in 2010 they won an American Music Award, and in 2011 they were collectively nominated for two Grammy Awards as well as the Brit Award for International Breakthrough Act of the year. In 2012, they received another soundtrack album Grammy nomination. By the start of the sixth season they were the most-charting (Billboard) act in history, a record held until March 2020.

2012–2014: The Family and music videos

Agron appeared less frequently in Glees fourth season, being reduced to a guest star, with co-star Naya Rivera saying that she did so by choice to work on other projects; Rivera and Agron shared an argument scene in the Thanksgiving episode that Vulture said was "weirdly powerful", noting the pair "have always popped in scenes like this, and have never gotten enough of them". Agron tweeted that the scene was one of her favorites, and Murphy joked that the two characters could have a spin-off. After reducing her role on Glee, Agron became the first of the cast to "cut out on her own", playing Belle Blake in Luc Besson's ultra-violent 2013 mob comedy film The Family opposite Robert De Niro, Tommy Lee Jones, and Michelle Pfeiffer. Besson reportedly wrote Belle with Agron in mind, wanting her to be in the film after seeing her perform on Glee. The Irish Independent wrote that "Agron is one of the best things in the film [and] successfully grounds the more preposterous aspects of the plot". It opened to mixed reviews but, also seen as the breakout performer by the then-CEO of production company EuropaCorp, critics praised Agron's performance and she was nominated for a Women Film Critics Circle Award.

Later in 2013 she appeared in the music video for the Killers' tenth-anniversary track "Just Another Girl", portraying the lead singer, Brandon Flowers. Rolling Stone said that even with the real Flowers also appearing, "Agron shines as the video's star." She briefly appeared in the fifth season of Glee for the 100th episode, and was notably absent from "The Quarterback", the tribute episode for Cory Monteith. In 2014, Agron starred as the scorned bride in Sam Smith's "I'm Not the Only One" music video. Glamour wrote that Agron's "convincing Desperate Housewives act [shows] off some major acting skills [and] really brings Sam's heart wrenching pop-ballad to life". She also directed the music video for "Till Sunrise" by Goldroom, starring Gabrielle Haugh and her brother Jason, and worked as a photographer with Jason for the February 2014 issue of Galore magazine. In 2015, she directed a short film for the opening of designer Tory Burch's Paris flagship store; she was also selected by Burch to represent the brand at that year's Met Gala. Agron returned to Glee for its final season but did not appear in the episode "A Wedding", when Quinn's best friends get married, which was seen to be equally as unusual as missing "The Quarterback".

2015–2019: Independent film, singing, and directing

After Glee, Agron pursued what critic Frank Scheck would later describe as "admirably adventurous screen choices". In 2017 she said that she had "wanted to return to doing indie films [after Glee and The Family], and found a lot of solace in doing so", explaining in 2022 that she "purposely had to recalibrate after [she] was fully off of that show, and make time for [herself]... after so many years of not having any control [and] just not [being] a person in [her] own world". She played the lead role in Natalia Leite's 2015 drama film Bare, which follows Agron's character, Sarah, as she becomes romantically involved with a female drifter. The film includes a nude scene, which had been extensively discussed between Leite and Agron, taking inspiration from My Summer of Love for the tone. Agron also made her professional theater debut in 2015. Turning down a Broadway play as she wanted to create a role, she played Dahlia in McQueen at the St. James Theatre on the West End; McQueen received generally negative reviews, and, in her PhD thesis for York University, Rebecca Halliday noted that reviews were not just profusely critical towards Agron's performance but also harsh on the actress herself. Agron was unable to reprise her role for the Theatre Royal Haymarket transfer due to filming commitments. She performed the U.S. national anthem in London at Winfield House, the U.S. ambassador's residence, for Independence Day 2015, with Katherine Jenkins performing the British national anthem.

Agron relocated to New York City in 2016 and took time away from working in that year. She appeared in several films released in 2017. She had a supporting role in the Vatican II-set film Novitiate, portraying Sister Mary Grace, a foil to the harsh instruction of the Mother Superior, opposite Melissa Leo and Margaret Qualley. Agron spoke about playing a Catholic nun as a Jewish actor, saying that she was interested in exploring faith and spirituality that exist outside of her own experiences. Justin Chang of the Los Angeles Times wrote that "in an ensemble without a weak link, special note should be made of [Agron], gently heartbreaking [in her role]", and San Francisco Chronicle Mick LaSalle opined that as part of the ensemble, Agron, as well as Rebecca Dayan and Julianne Nicholson, "would be the highlight of any other film, the person audiences would go home talking about". Agron also portrayed Alison Miller, the lead of the drama Hollow in the Land. The film was often compared to Winter's Bone, with The New York Times saying that the "movie is not as tense [as Winter's Bone], but it gets close thanks to Ms. Agron's resolute performance and [its] hostile small town setting"; The Hollywood Reporter said that "Agron delivers a compelling turn in this atmospheric backwoods mystery."

In September 2017, Agron made her singing debut with a residency at the Café Carlyle, saying that she "missed singing publicly" and wanted to pursue this again in New York. In her set she performed music originally sung by male acts, with BroadwayWorld noting that, for possibly the first time, people would hear her sing in her preferred register; she told WWD that she saw an improvement in her vocal quality using her own register again after being uncomfortable hitting high notes for Glee. Music critic Will Friedwald described her as "a post-millennial update of Julie London"; Paul Hagen of Metrosource said that her lower range "is smooth as single malt scotch"; and Theater Pizzazz Eric J. Grimm wrote that, "free of auto tune and songs out of her vocal range, she reveals herself to be a capable and precise singer with an appreciation for excellent lyrics." Agron returned to the Carlyle in January and February 2019, again performing a setlist "tailored for her husky register", with a larger band. This performance was advertised to feature songs by female acts, though she still sung many songs performed by men. Of the second show, Matt Smith, also Theater Pizzazz, said that Agron used minimal commentary, which "[felt] as if she's second-guessing herself", but that any lack of expression in commentary was made up for by her expression through the songs; Agron selected songs that she found romantic and playful. Smith complimented that her voice is "soothing and soulful, [and] makes the already-cozy Café Carlyle feel that much more intimate". Agron suggested that she would consider releasing an album, but not of the pop music featured on Glee.

Berlin, I Love You, an installment of the Cities of Love anthology film series, was released in 2019. Agron directed a segment in the film from a screenplay by David Vernon, as well as playing a puppeteer who reinvigorates the life of a burnt-out Hollywood star played by Luke Wilson. She was initially approached to act in the segment, and asked if she could direct it instead before being hired for both roles; filming for the segment took one day. Reception to the film was generally negative: Peter Debruge of Variety wrote that "by and large, the film feels aimless and uninspired ... the most effective sequence may be [Agron's] offering", a sentiment echoed by Jackie K. Cooper, while Peter Sobczynski of RogerEbert.com felt it was "such a wan little embarrassment that its presence can only be explained by the fact that ... Wilson and Agron might attract a few more viewers."

2020–present: Return to prominence
In 2020, Agron appeared as Kim Beckett in the film Shiva Baby, a comedy set at a Jewish mourning service. The film and its cast received widespread praise, with some reviews noting the depth Agron brought to her role. The Hollywood Reporter, /Film, and Variety described her performance as "perfect" and "flawless". She then portrayed Laura Riding in the historical biopic The Laureate; telling the story of Riding's life with Robert Graves and their lovers, it premiered in 2021.

In March and April 2022, Agron performed her third residency at the Café Carlyle. Reviews noted her charming commentary and ability to connect with the audience, with Front Row Center writing that her "alluring badinage is as delightful as her song." Stephen Mosher for BroadwayWorld said that her "famously husky... whisky tenor and relaxed stylings [bring] an atmosphere of levity and love".

In As They Made Us, directed by Mayim Bialik and released in April 2022, Agron played the lead role, Abigail, alongside Dustin Hoffman and Candice Bergen. Abigail is the daughter of Hoffman and Bergen's characters; Agron had previously played Bergen's daughter in the 2010 film The Romantics and said it was "super special" to work with her again at a different stage. The film deals with parental death, something which Agron related to due to experiences with her own father's illness. She noted that about a year before filming the project she had finally become ready to address father-daughter relationships in her work.

She is part of the main cast of the Netflix original television show El Elegido, an adaptation of the Mark Millar comic series American Jesus, which is set to be released in 2024.

Public image

Image and fashion

Agron's public image and style have been described as "old Hollywood", something she has enjoyed since she was a child admiring figures including Audrey Hepburn, Lucille Ball and Leslie Caron. Like classic stars, Agron speaks with a Mid-Atlantic accent, and she has connected her views on keeping private to this era, saying: "I think people know too many things about actors these days ... Back in the day, you knew very little about the stars". The role of Quinn in Glee saw Agron nominated for the Teen Choice Award for Female Breakout Star in 2010, and she and other cast members were awarded the Screen Actors Guild Award for Ensemble in a Comedy Series that same year. In 2011, her roles in Glee and I Am Number Four saw Agron place on the IMDb list of top emerging stars, and the Victoria's Secret models ranked her as the sexiest smile in Hollywood. Following the death of Cory Monteith in 2013, Agron criticized the lack of privacy afforded her Glee castmates by paparazzi, though said she had come to accept this kind of treatment in exchange for the positives of being an actor. Agron has since said that the level of success Glee had when she was in her early twenties "[catapulted her] into a world [in which she was] not very equipped to, kind of, explore that coming-of-age in the public eye", adding that the sudden emergence of social media at the time did not help; she explained that she chose to travel to keep grounded. Agron was one of the most-followed and most influential celebrities on Twitter in 2012 and 2013.

Entertainment Tonight has called Agron a "fashion icon", and Vogue magazine has covered her style and taste, praising her takes on different styles and remixing fashion. She has been credited with influencing the popularity of the fishtail braid; shaggy bob; and pompadour hairstyles, and her presence at Met Galas helped popularize it to become one of New York's biggest social events. Agron describes her style as "eclectic", adding that she enjoys dressing in both feminine and masculine looks. In 2015, she said that her style and the way she presents herself are "more to the prudish side". In 2010, she appeared on the cover of GQ with Glee co-stars Michele and Monteith; after "minor controversy" following complaints that the actors were dressed too provocatively for their younger fans, Agron wrote an apology on her blog. Agron and her Glee character are referenced in the controversial 2016 song "Einstein yori Dianna Agron" by Japanese idol group HKT48, as the epitome of beauty and charm. She is also named in the liner notes of the Taylor Swift song "22", as an inspiration of the song, and some fans have speculated that Swift's song "Wonderland" also references her.

Though she became known for playing the gentile across from Jewish characters, Agron is a practicing Jew. She knows Hebrew and visited Israel to study her faith in 2016. The debate on Jewish characters being portrayed by Jewish actors became prominent in 2018 with the success of The Marvelous Mrs. Maisel, and a response from physiognomist Sharrona Pearl in Jewish culture magazine Tablet cited Agron and her roles as overtly shiksa characters as a reason why more representation of Jewish performers is not needed, saying these are evidence of Jewishness not being a physical trait. Other Jewish media have commented on Agron's Glee character, with the Jewish Women's Archive suggesting that she may have made cheerleading more visible to Jewish girls, and Agron's appearance, with Hey Alma noting that this is "something the Jewish media loves to talk about, somewhat saltily." More discussions of actors' Jewishness came with the release of Shiva Baby, which has a non-Jewish lead actress while Agron's Kim is, ironically, the only character in the film who is not considered Jewish; writer-director Emma Seligman said that Agron was excited to be involved in a Jewish movie, telling Jewschool that it was "so sad to hear, but because of her looks, [Agron's] Jewishness is constantly questioned".

Relationships
While Agron is known for keeping her romances private, she has been in several high-profile relationships. In July 2010, she began dating British actor Alex Pettyfer, her I Am Number Four co-star. Pettyfer was reportedly controlling and paranoid throughout their relationship, though they began cohabiting in 2010. The couple had a messy break-up in February 2011, the day after the film was released, with reports that he threatened her over the phone and had a "heated confrontation" with actor Sebastian Stan, someone with whom Agron was close in early 2011. She temporarily moved to a hotel under a false name so that Pettyfer would not be able to find her, and Pettyfer was instructed not to attend an event at which she would be present. In early 2011, Agron met actor Chris Evans at an Oscars party and the two were linked in April that year; reportedly, Evans' brother Scott was a fan of Agron from Glee and supported the idea of the couple. Agron began dating Stan in June 2011; they split in December, due to Agron being unable to spend time with him while having to work on Glee, but began dating again in February 2012 and were still together in April.

It was first reported that Agron was dating Mumford & Sons guitarist Winston Marshall in July 2015, and the couple became engaged in winter 2015/16. They were married on October 15, 2016, in Morocco, with Agron wearing a Valentino Fall 2016 off-the-runway dress noted as one of the most expensive celebrity wedding dresses ever. Agron and Marshall kept their relationship private, including not posting about each other on social media. After splitting, they separated in 2019 and divorced in 2020. In 2022, Marshall said that splitting up, which they did around the same time he got sober, was painful.

Agron was linked to Belgian painter Harold Ancart in 2021 and reportedly dated actor Bradley Cooper in 2022. She was again with Ancart in 2022, when it was reported that an incident involving her and publisher Lucas Zwirner caused Ancart to suddenly cut ties with art dealer and gallery owner (and Lucas' father) David Zwirner.

Agron's sexuality has been subject to much public speculation; lesbian culture website Autostraddle reflected that Agron wearing a T-shirt reading "Likes Girls" in 2011 "was the moment that started the whole [internet] gay discourse", and a 2016 episode of IFC's Boxed In satirized Agron making ambiguous statements on the subject, something common in Celesbian culture. Her close friendship with Taylor Swift led to some fans developing a long-standing theory that Swift is "secretly gay"; speculation of a relationship between the pair was common in Hollywood in 2012 and Agron was asked about its veracity as a guest on Jimmy Kimmel Live!. She was described as a "queer personality" in the 2022 Pride Month edition of BELLA magazine.

Activism

Charity and advocacy

The Guardian noted in 2015 that Agron is "also known for her activism, supporting charities and advocacy groups when not acting." She is an activist for LGBT+ rights and human rights, and has said that being able to engage with large-scale charity work is one of the positives of her job. She has also given her time to charitable endeavors supporting children, including organizations like Camp Wonder and UNICEF, and has hosted and participated in various fundraisers for literacy non-profit 826LA, including emceeing the 2010 concert "Chickens in Love". Since 2012, Agron has been a GLAAD Spirit Day ambassador, and since 2014 she has been a Global Citizen Ambassador, regularly participating in the Global Citizen Festival. In politics, Agron endorsed Barack Obama's 2012 presidential campaign, Hillary Clinton's 2016 presidential campaign, and Joe Biden's 2020 presidential campaign.

In 2011 she attended the Trevor Project's Trevor Live! with Glee co-stars Kevin McHale and Darren Criss, and on June 2, 2012, she hosted the GLAAD Media Awards in San Francisco. Naya Rivera and Cory Monteith had hosted a parallel event on March 24, 2012, in New York City, auctioning off kisses to the audience; Agron did the same, raising $5,500 for the campaign. In women's rights, Agron spoke at the 18th San Francisco Power of Choice Luncheon to celebrate the 40th anniversary of Roe v. Wade in 2013, and criticized the Supreme Court of the United States when it repealed this in June 2022. In the arts, Agron works with Platform Presents, a British organization founded by Gala Gordon to provide a platform to new talent, and is an advocate for female filmmakers: she was a jurist for the Nora Ephron Prize at the 2017 Tribeca Film Festival, and for the Through Her Lens grant at Tribeca in 2017 and 2018. Supporting youth causes, in 2014, Agron took part in a charity weekend as part of the Big Slick Foundation, an organization of Kansas City-related celebrities, to help raise funds for Children's Mercy Hospital, and she and other Glee stars participated in the Young Storytellers Foundation "Glee Big Show", which featured live performances of five scripts written by fifth grade students to support arts programs in public schools. In August 2014 she wrote an article for NBC News to promote United Nations (UN) International Youth Day.

Agron has prominently been a supporter of charities for refugees, particularly children, affected by war. In 2012, Agron visited the Somaly Mam Foundation's Kampong Cham center, where she met child and teenage residents, and in 2013 she promoted a campaign fundraiser benefiting the foundation. In November 2014, Agron, among many other international artists, was featured on the United Nations Children's Fund charity single "Imagine". She has raised money and advocated for War Child since 2014, particularly for Syrian refugees, and in 2016, she traveled with the UN to visit resettled Syrian refugees in Austria and Jordan. She has also supported military personnel, providing services and live entertainment to United States troops and their families as part of the December 2014 United Service Organizations tour at Bagram air field, Afghanistan, and locations in Spain, Italy, Turkey, and the UK.

You, Me and Charlie
You, Me & Charlie (YM&C) was a curation platform launched by Agron on December 12, 2011. Along with help from several other contributors, she wrote and collected posts on subjects including music, art, fashion, and daily inspiration. The name of the website refers to Charlie, one of Agron's childhood nicknames, "her male alter ego[,] and the star of the short stories she'd write in high school". Several short films and videos created by Lexy Hulme, a dancer and friend of Agron, were also shared on the website, which accepted submissions for inspiration posts through a related Tumblr blog. The site served as inspiration for young artists, and Vanity Fair championed it as a stress reliever, saying that the site is "full of sunshine, optimism, and pretty people"; InStyle promoted how the platform spread activism, saying that "these days it seems every celebrity has an online presence [but] Agron uses social media in a truly inspired way." The idea for YM&C came from how "people really responded so well to [Agron's personal blog], so [she] just wanted to open it up and have it be more of a community". In February 2013, Agron hosted a concert for the curation blog in Los Angeles, where she performed Fleetwood Mac's "Dreams" and Tina Turner's "What's Love Got to Do with It" with the band A House For Lions.

Selected filmography

Awards and nominations

See also
GQ Glee photoshoot controversy
"Einstein yori Dianna Agron" controversy

Notes

References

Footnotes

Citations

Sources
Audio-visual media

Bibliography

Features

Interviews

Literature

News

Reviews

Web

External links

 
 
 

1986 births
Living people
21st-century American actresses
21st-century American Jews
21st-century American women singers
Activists from Georgia (U.S. state)
Activists from San Antonio
Activists from the San Francisco Bay Area
Actors from Savannah, Georgia
Actresses from Georgia (U.S. state)
Actresses from San Antonio
Actresses from the San Francisco Bay Area
American contraltos
American female dancers
American women jazz singers
American jazz singers
American film actresses
American folk-pop singers
American queer actresses
American people of Russian-Jewish descent
American stage actresses
American television actresses
American women film directors
American writers of Russian descent
American Ashkenazi Jews
Articles containing video clips
Cabaret singers
Dancers from California
Dancers from Georgia (U.S. state)
Dancers from Texas
Jewish dancers
Female music video directors
Film directors from Georgia (U.S. state)
Film directors from New York City
Film directors from San Francisco
Film directors from Texas
Folk musicians from Georgia (U.S. state)
Folk musicians from New York (state)
Folk musicians from Texas
Jazz musicians from New York (state)
Jazz musicians from San Francisco
Jewish American actresses
Jewish American musicians
Jewish American screenwriters
Jewish jazz musicians
Jewish women singers
Jews and Judaism in Savannah
American LGBT rights activists
Musicians from San Antonio
Musicians from Savannah, Georgia
Musicians from the San Francisco Bay Area
People from Burlingame, California
LGBT Jews
Jewish singers
Queer singers 
Singers from Georgia (U.S. state)
Singers from San Francisco
Singers from Texas
Writers from San Antonio
Writers from Savannah, Georgia
Writers from the San Francisco Bay Area